Charles Frederick Baker (5 August 1803 – 6 February 1875) was an English member of the Church Missionary Society (CMS) active as a missionary in New Zealand in the 19th century. He supervised the construction of the historic church at Russell and was involved in the Treaty of Waitangi proceedings, a collection consisting of his journals and papers was added to the UNESCO Memory of the World New Zealand register in 2018.

Biography 
Baker was born on 5 August 1803 at Packington.  After an education at the CMS College at Islington he left England in June 1827 arriving in the Bay of Islands, New Zealand in June 1828.

Early days at Paihia
Baker supervised the construction of Christ Church, Russell which, built in 1835 and 1836, is New Zealand's oldest surviving church. Charles Darwin along with Robert FitzRoy (later 2nd Governor of New Zealand) and the officers of HMS Beagle contributed £15 towards the construction. On Christmas day 1835 Darwin and FitzRoy attended a service held in Paihia by Baker, which FitzRoy records as being delivered in both English and Māori. FitzRoy remarked on Baker's seemingly fluent Māori, however, was critical of Baker's mixed delivery given the congregation consisted of predominantly European settlers.

Treaty of Waitangi
In 1840, as a result of the absence of Henry Williams, Baker was responsible for overseeing the CMS Paihia headquarters. He was involved in the preparations for the Treaty of Waitangi and was present at the signing.   

On 29 January William Hobson arrived in the Bay of Islands aboard HMS Herald, Baker along with British Resident James Busby met Hobson aboard the ship. After having left the Herald, Baker received two letters from Hobson. The first, requested Baker have invitations for a meeting printed and sent expeditiously to the Maori chiefs; it was at this meeting the following week that the Treaty of Waitangi was signed.  In the second, Hobson requested to use Baker's church at Russell (then called Kororāreka) the following day to read his Proclamations. He also asks Baker to have drafts of the Proclamations printed, and that Baker use his influence to ensure attendance of the reading of the Proclamations.  The invitations and the Proclamations would be printed that night in the printing press located in a semi-detached wing in Baker's house by William Colenso. The following day, Baker witnessed Hobson's Proclamations at Christ Church, Russell.

On 6 February 1840 Baker was present at the signing of the Treaty of Waitangi.  According to Colenso's 1890 account, Baker was challenged by the chief Moka regarding land holdings. Moka first addressed William Hobson in Māori, with Henry Williams acting as an interpreter, before addressing Baker directly. Moka's remarks (translated into English) are given by Colenso as follows:   

Colenso then describes how, prompted by this dialogue, James Busby and Henry Williams successively made statements in English defending their respective land holdings. He claims Tamati Pukututu, chief of the Te Uri-o-te-hawato tribe (a sub-tribe (Hapū) of the Ngāpuhi tribe), also spoke in defence of the missionaries and chastised Moka, and several of his fellow chieftains, for having sold their land in return for foreign goods.

While the veracity of Colenso's account of the treaty has been questioned, it remains a seminal account of the treaty proceedings.  Colenso's relationship with his fellow CMS missionaries, in particular Baker, had deteriorated in 1852 following the revelation of Colenso's affair with his servant Rīpeka.

Tolaga Bay and Rangitukia 
In January 1843 Baker moved to Tolaga Bay to establish a mission station there. While at Tolaga Bay Baker benefited significantly from the support and protection of important chief Te Kani-a-Takirau. In 2007 the remains of buildings that were part of the mission station, and over 40 graves were unearthed. In 1851 Baker left Tolaga Bay to seek treatment for rheumatism at Auckland.

In 1854, sufficiently recovered from his period of ill health, Baker left Auckland to take charge of the Rangitukia mission station. There Baker was responsible for supervising the construction of a sequence of churches, notably St John’s Church at Rangitukia (1854-56).   Baker had a significant impact on the 1950s style of church architecture in the East Coast area. The construction of St John's Church was documented by Baker's son Joseph Goadby Baker, who described it as capable of supporting a Māori congregation of around 2000. The opening was attended by the Bishop George Selwynn, who estimated that in excess of 3000 Māori attended the opening. In his journals, Baker recorded the impacts of a measles outbreak at Rangitukia in 1954. His assistant Pita Whakangaua died as a result of the same disease the following year.

Later life and death
He was appointed as a deacon in 1853, and in 1860 ordained priest. He retired to Auckland in 1865 where, until his health deteriorated, he was active preaching; regularly visiting the stockades and the hospital.  Baker died on 6 February 1875 after a period of illness and is buried at St Stephen's Churchyard, Parnell, Auckland.

Marriages and issue 
Baker married firstly Sophia Riley (died 1826) by whom he had one child Dorcas Sophia Baker (1824 - 1875), who married Native Land Court Judge  Thomas Henry Smith.

Baker married secondly Hannah Maria Bailey, daughter of William Bailey and Hannah Goadby, on 11 June 1827 by whom he had 13 children including: 
 William Bailey Baker (1828 - 1865), resident Magistrate for Waiapū and civil servant.  He served as Chief Translator to H.M. forces at Tauranga during the New Zealand Wars, and as resident magistrate there also . He produced a range of ethological works on Māori language and culture, and is also remembered for his first-hand account of the Treaty of Waitangi. 
 Charles Pratt Baker (1829 - 1862), appointed Resident Magistrate for Tolaga Bay (Uawa) but died in the sinking of the Pole Star before taking up the post. 
 Ebenezer Baker (1830 - 1905), resident Magistrate for Wairoa. 
 Hannah Maria Baker (1831 - 1868)
 Charlotte Baker (1833 - 1838)
 Anne Gunn (1835 - 1918)
 Samuel Marsden Baker (1837 - 1915), civil servant and first interpreter to the New Zealand Legislative Council.
 Rev. Frederick Thomas Baker (1839 - 1896), married Emily Elizabeth Larkins daughter of the Rev. Frederick Larkins. Attended St John's College, Auckland 1871 - 1873, and was ordained priest in 1875.
 Joseph Goadby Baker (1840 - 1924)
 Mary Eliza King (1841 - 1860)
 Henry Williams Baker (1843 - 1927)
 Charlotte Elizabeth Baker (1844 - 1866)

Legacy 
In 2018 Baker's journals and papers were added to the UNESCO Memory of the World New Zealand register which recognises heritage items of national significance.   The collection is currently held at the Auckland War Memorial Museum.

References

Notes

Treaty of Waitangi
19th-century English Anglican priests
Church Mission Society missionaries
English Anglican missionaries
Anglican missionaries in New Zealand
1803 births
1875 deaths